Alpha Sigma Phi, commonly known as Alpha Sig, is an intercollegiate men's social fraternity with 181 active chapters and provisional chapters. Founded at Yale in 1845, it is the 10th oldest Greek letter fraternity in the United States.

The fraternity practices many traditions. Its Latin motto is Causa Latet Vis Est Notissima ("The cause is hidden, the results well-known"). The fraternity's official symbol is the phoenix, as the phoenix rises from the ashes of its old body, signifying the re-founding of the fraternity in the early 1900s. Due to active expansion efforts, Alpha Sigma Phi continues to offer services and opportunities to over 8,000 undergraduate students and well over 72,000 living members.

History

Founding
Alpha Sigma Phi was founded by three men at Yale College in 1845 as a secret sophomore society composed of many of the school's poets, athletes, and scholars. Upon rising through the ranks of the school, members shared membership with Alpha Sigma Phi in their sophomore year, one of three fraternities in their junior year and Skull and Bones or Scroll and Key in their senior year.

The founders of Alpha Sigma Phi were:

Louis Manigault was born at Rue de la Paix #17, Paris, France, on November 21, 1828, while his mother and father were visiting their ancestors' homeland. He was a seventh generation descendant of Pierre Manigault, a French Huguenot who fled La Rochelle, France, because of religious persecution with the revocation of the Edict of Nantes, in 1685. These Manigaults immigrated to South Carolina, where they became very prosperous in the occupations of planting crops and the trading of planted goods, as well as merchandising.
Stephen Ormsby Rhea was the son of John Rhea, an important cotton planter of Louisiana who helped open the disputed territory of West Florida and made it a part of the US and the state of Louisiana, through his involvement in the French and Indian war.
Horace Spangler Weiser, of York, Pennsylvania, was a descendant of Conrad Weiser, also a refugee from Europe who became famous in the French and Indian War, representing several provisional chapters in treaty negotiations with Native Americans.

Manigault and Rhea met at St. Paul's Preparatory School near Flushing, New York, where both were members of the same literary society and were preparing themselves for admission to Yale. Weiser attended a private school in New Haven, and he met Rhea early in his freshman year, who introduced him to Manigault.

Once at Yale, Manigault and Rhea became members of Yale's Calliopean Literary Society, and Weiser was a member of the Linonian Literary Society. Manigault was very much interested in the class society system at Yale and noted the class fraternities provided experience for their members and prepared them for competition in literary contests. The sophomore class there had only one society, Kappa Sigma Theta, which displayed an attitude of superiority toward non-fraternity men.

Manigault revealed to his friends Rhea and Weiser a plan for founding another sophomore society. Rhea agreed and enlisted Weiser to become the three founders of Alpha Sigma Phi. Their first official meeting was held in Manigault's room on Chapel Street on December 6, 1845. The constitution and ritual were then written and the fraternity pin was designed. The first pledge class, of 14 members, was initiated on June 24, 1846.

After the birth of Alpha Sigma Phi, an intense rivalry began with Kappa Sigma Theta. This was expressed in their publications, Kappa Sigma Theta's The Yale Banger and Alpha Sigma Phi's The Yale Tomahawk. In 1852, the editors of the Tomahawk were expelled after violating faculty orders to cease publication. However, the rivalry between the organizations continued until 1858, when Kappa Sigma Theta was suppressed by the faculty.

Beyond Yale
The first expansion effort was to Amherst College, Massachusetts, in 1847, but it only lasted about six months, at which time due to faculty opposition at Amherst, the parent chapter requested that it dissolve and return the constitution. However, a fragmentary document in the Yale library suggests that Beta was chartered in 1850 at Harvard University but lived a very short life due to a wave of puritanism. The chapter at Harvard was revived in 1911 as Beta Chapter but only survived about 20 years; the charter was withdrawn due to Harvard's anti-fraternity environment. When the Amherst College chapter was restored in 1854, it was designated as either Gamma or Delta Chapter. (a charter document found in Yale archives shows the latter, but Baird's Manual from its earliest editions and later records of the fraternity refer to it as Gamma.) When the chapter at Marietta College was chartered in 1860, it was given the Delta designation, despite the parent chapter being aware of this discrepancy.

When the Civil War broke out across the United States, almost every member of Delta at Marietta enlisted in the Union Army. Three of the brothers gave their lives fighting for the Union cause. Former chapter presidents William B. Whittlesey and George B. Turner fell on the battlefields of Chattanooga and Lookout Mountain. They willed their personal possessions and their swords to the chapter, which treasured those mementos until the chapter closed for two decades in the mid-1990s.

From 1858 through 1863 the sophomore members of Alpha Sigma Phi were elected in almost equal numbers by the two stronger Junior Class fraternities, with a smaller number going to the third. In 1864, however, the mother chapter at Yale was torn by internal dissension. Because less attention was being given to the sophomore class societies, some Alpha Sigma Phi members pledged to Delta Kappa Epsilon, a junior class society, and attempted to turn the control of Alpha Sigma Phi over to Delta Kappa Epsilon. However, the attempt was thwarted by members of Alpha Sigma Phi who had pledged to the other two junior class societies. A conflict ensued, and the faculty suppressed Alpha Sigma Phi to end the disorder. However, the traditions of Alpha Sigma Phi were carried on by two new sophomore class societies, Delta Beta Xi and Phi Theta Psi. Louis Manigault sought to renew his loyalty and friendship with his brothers of Alpha Sigma Phi, and agreed with Rhea and Weiser to consider Delta Beta Xi its true descendant. They were unaware at the time that Delta Chapter at Marietta still existed as Alpha Sigma Phi.

The second founders were:

Wayne Montgomery Musgrave, an honors graduate of New York University, Yale and Harvard. He provided the organizational spark that fanned Alpha Sigma Phi into national prominence.

Edwin Morey Waterbury, born in Geneseo, New York on September 26, 1884, son of Dr. Reuben A. and Frances Waterbury. Dr. Waterbury was an educator, and vice-principal of the New York State Normal School at Geneseo from 1873 to 1895.

With the inactivation of Delta Beta Xi at Yale, Alpha Sigma Phi was kept alive only at Marietta by Delta. At Yale, in fall 1906 four friends agreed in a conversation over a card game that an organization was needed that was open to all students, instead of representing only the sophomore or junior classes. The four friends were Robert L. Ervin, Benjamin F. Crenshaw, Arthur S. Ely, and Edwin M. Waterbury.

Other members soon joined the group in their mission, the first of which were Fredrick H. Waldron and Wayne M. Musgrave. Ervin knew some of the alumni brothers of Delta at Marietta and asked them to send the first letter to Delta. On March 27, 1907, Ely, Crenshaw, Musgrave, Waldron, and Waterbury traveled to Marietta and were initiated into Alpha Sigma Phi. Upon returning to New Haven, they initiated the other friends they had recruited into the new Alpha chapter at Yale.

Many of the old Alpha members returned to Yale upon hearing the news of the refounding, and helped acquire the fraternity's first piece of real estate, the "Tomb", a windowless two-story building. No non-member was allowed entrance. No member could speak of the interior of the building, and were even expected to remain silent while passing by the exterior of the building.

Expansion

A new national organization was formed at an Alpha Sigma Phi conference at Marietta in 1907, and within a year there were three new chapters: Zeta at Ohio State, Eta at the University of Illinois, and Theta at the University of Michigan. In 1909, Iota chapter was established at Cornell University.  In 1910, another convention was held with the members of the former chapters at Yale, Amherst and Ohio Wesleyan University, and a delegation from the Yale Delta Beta Xi fraternity. All of these pledged to anew their loyalty to a restored Alpha Sigma Phi, and soon afterward the chapters Mu at the University of Washington, Nu at University of California, Berkeley, and Upsilon at the Pennsylvania State University were added.

Alpha Sigma Phi survived World War I fairly easily and even recruited many new members during those years. In the post-war era, Alpha Sigma Phi expanded at the rate of one chapter per year. In 1939, Phi Pi Phi merged with Alpha Sigma Phi, as the Great Depression left that fraternity with only five of its original twenty-one chapters. World War II hit Alpha Sigma Phi hard, with many brothers losing their lives due to the conflict, forcing many chapters to close.

On September 6, 1946, Alpha Kappa Pi merged with Alpha Sigma Phi. Alpha Kappa Pi had never had a national office, but was still a strong fraternity. During the war, they had lost many chapters and realized the need for a more stable national organization. Alpha Sigma Phi expanded again in 1965 by five more chapters when it merged with Alpha Gamma Upsilon. The 1980s found a younger generation of leaders taking the reins of the fraternity. Keeping in mind one of its oldest traditions, being a fraternity run by undergraduates, the leadership and undergraduates began expanding in new directions.

In 2006, Alpha Sigma Phi won the North American Interfraternity Conference's Laurel Wreath Award for the Ralph F. Burns Leadership Institute for new members. In 2016, the fraternity won the Laurel Wreath Award for their educational program "Toastmasters' Lite". The program provides undergraduate brothers the opportunity to learn and practice public speaking skills.

Awards
Grand Senior Presidents Cup 
First presented at the 1960 Grand Chapter, this award recognizes chapters of the Fraternity - one for a chapter at an institution with a large undergraduate population (20,001+ undergraduates), one for a chapter at an institution with a medium undergraduate population (8,501-20,000 undergraduates) and one for a chapter with a small undergraduate population (fewer than 8,500 undergraduates) - that have best exemplified the ideals and purpose of the Fraternity. Chapters who score the highest in all areas of the Annual Report are recognized with the Grand Senior President's Cup. This is the highest honor a chapter can receive within Alpha Sigma Phi Fraternity. The Chapter must be in good standing with Fraternity Headquarters and excel in all aspects of the Fraternity's Annual Report. In the 2022 year, the Grand Senior President's Cup, the Delta Upsilon, Theta Pi and the Delta Tau chapters have been presented to the chapters. Delta Tau has the highest number of Grand Senior Presidents Cup awards at nine awards overall.

Most Improved Chapter Award
The most improved chapter award is given to the chapter that has demonstrated significant improvement from one award period to the next award period. In 2022, the Alpha Pi chapter at Purdue University won this award.

Victor B. Scott Award
The Victor B. Scott Award is awarded annually to the chapter whose academic grade point average most greatly exceeds its college or University's all men's average. Brother Victor Scott presented the scholarship plaque for the purpose of ‘creating an incentive on the part of each chapter of the Fraternity to strive for higher average in scholarship on the campus on which the chapter was located. After the merger with Alpha Sigma Phi, an award was named in his honor for outstanding chapter scholarship. In 2018, Grand Historian Emeritus, Robert Kutz, UC-Berkeley '67, established an endowment to allow for this award to once again be bestowed. In 2022, the Beta Nu chapter at WV Wesleyan received this award.

Controversies 
In 2019, the fraternity at the University of Wisconsin were suspended and after suspension placed on probation for hazing and public humiliation. Pledges were forced to run errands for initiated members, wear Dora the Explorer backpacks, and carry fruit on campus.

In 2018, Jacob Stephens, the fraternity's treasurer at the University of Oklahoma was convicted of stealing $32,000 from his fraternity. He was charged with embezzlement.

In 2018, the fraternity at the University of Michigan was shut down for abusing pledges and forcing them to consume alcohol.

In 2017, the fraternity at the University of Arizona was kicked off campus for blindfolding pledges and making them consume alcohol.  One fraternity member was arrested for assault for pushing a pledge into a pillar at the fraternity house.

In 2017, the fraternity at Pennsylvania State University was suspended for hazing, forced alcohol consumption, and misbehavior that endangered members of the fraternity.

Notable members

Athletics

Authors, editors, publishers and journalists

Business leaders and entrepreneurs

Education

Government

Musicians, stage, and screen performers

Controversy over inclusion of women
In 1983, Tau chapter of Stanford University split off from the national fraternity organization over controversy regarding that chapter's inclusion of women as initiated members.  The chapter had begun the tradition of initiating women some years earlier, but when a female member became president of the chapter, the national fraternity organization reacted with an immediate suspension and threat of charter revocation.  Tau Chapter became Alpha Sigma Co-Ed Fraternity thereafter, surviving independently for over ten years.

See also
List of Alpha Sigma Phi Chapters, provisional chapters, and Interest Groups
List of social fraternities and sororities

References

External links
Alpha Sigma Phi - official website
Songs of Alpha Sigma Phi - audio recordings (WAV)

 
North American Interfraternity Conference
Student societies in the United States
Student organizations established in 1845
1845 establishments in Connecticut